Pyaar Prema Kaadhal is a 2018 Indian Tamil-language romantic comedy film directed by Elan, and produced by Yuvan Shankar Raja, under the banner YSR Films, who also composed music for the film. Co-produced by S. N. Rajarajan under the banner K Productions. The film stars Harish Kalyan and debutant Raiza Wilson. The film marked the first project of both the lead actors, after rising to fame from the television series Bigg Boss Tamil. Anand Babu, Pandian, Rekha, Ramadoss and Subbu Panchu appear in supporting roles. The film's cinematography was handled by Raja Bhattacharjee, with editing done by S. Manikumaran. The film was launched in December 2017, along with the commencement of principal photography, and was completed in June 2018. The film released on 10 August 2018, to a positive response from the audience as well as critics, praising the lead actors' performances, the screenplay, and the film's soundtrack. The film became a commercial success. The film won two Filmfare Awards South and two SIIMA Awards, including the Best Debut Actress Award for Raiza in both ceremonies.

Plot

Sree is an innocent and fun-loving IT employee from Chennai who lives with his parents. He has a crush on Sindhuja a beautiful and independent modern-day girl who works in the office opposite his. Sindhuja eventually joins Sree's office and invites him to hang out with her at the club to which Sree happily agrees. At the club, he realises, Sindhu drinks alcohol, swears freely, and is a complete party girl. He discovers that Sindhu doesn't know her own birthday because only her mother knew it and her mother died when she was very young. Over time they become good friends and he falls in love with her.

One day the duo gets stuck in an elevator and ends up kissing instinctively. Sindhuja brings Sree home and they have sex after which Sree confesses his love for Sindhuja. To his shock, she rejects him saying that they are only good friends and insists that she does not love him. She refers to their sex as a casual indulgence whereupon Sree leaves her house in complete disgust. Sindhuja constantly tries to pacify him and Sree finally gives in, agreeing to continue being friends with her and begin to hang out like before. At a party, Sindhu tries to get intimate with a drunk Sree but he gets upset and shouts at her for merely using him and criticizes her character. He also reveals to everyone that he had sex with Sindhuja, making her angry. Sindhu confesses that now she also loves Sree but is disheartened by his behavior and mindset, thus ending the party on an unpleasant note.

Sree seeks the help of the local tailor Thangaraj and his colleague Satish and attempts to reconcile with Sindhuja. He joins the dance classes conducted by Sindhu's father and eventually they patch up. As per Sindhu's wish they decide to begin a life in relationship without the knowledge of Sree's parents since they would clearly disapprove of the idea. Sree makes a plan for his daily routine, to keep his parents oblivious of his relationship and moves into a rented house near his home with Sindhu. While Sindhu starts becoming slightly aggressive, Sree continues to steer the boat of their relationship. One night, when Sindhu is moody and irksome, Sree takes her out and reveals to her that it is her birthday and tells her that he had traced it out after a lot of difficulty. Sindhu is extremely touched and her aggressiveness comes to an end.

Sree constantly tries to talk Sindhu into agreeing to their marriage but she sternly refuses since she wants to achieve her dream of opening a restaurant in Los Angeles. Meanwhile, Sree's mother is hell-bent on finding a good bride for him which puts Sree in a complete dilemma. Sindhu's father invites the couple for his dance show but Sree's mother falls sick and he comes in late for the show, making Sindhu upset. At the show, he pesters her about their marriage citing his mother's ill health as his imminent reason to soon marry. When Sindhu refuses to budge, he decides to break up with her for his mother's sake and to marry a girl, that his parents fix an alliance with.

A day before his marriage, Sindhu turns up at his home to bid him goodbye before leaving Chennai. The two part each other with heavy hearts. On the day of his wedding, while Sindhu's father is driving her to the airport he confesses about how he did not acknowledge Sindhu's mother's love for him and how he regretted it after she died and asks Sindhu not to make the same mistake. Suddenly Sindhu realises she has to stop the marriage and rushes back to Sree's wedding avenue only to realize that the wedding is over and she turns to leave in tears.

Three years later Sindhu has opened her dream restaurant. She eventually learns that Sree is getting a divorce. Sindhu's father visits Sree's parents and tells about his daughter's love for Sree, while Sree's parents lament over his failed marriage. Sree's wife had got an abortion, as revenge for an argument which Sree won. Sree's mother accepts the fact that happily live-in relationships are better than unhappy marriages. Suddenly, Sree's parents and Sindhu's father realize that both of them have been missing for three days and wonder where they are. The film ends as Sree and Sindhu are seen having sex secretly as their parents call them. Their mindsets are shown to have reversed as Sree now wants a live-in relationship but Sindhu prefers marriage.

Cast

Production 
In late October 2017, musician Yuvan Shankar Raja revealed that he would produce his first feature film, which would be a co-production with Rajarajan of K Productions. The film was announced as a romantic comedy to be directed by Elan, who debuted with Graghanam with Harish Kalyan and Raiza Wilson chosen to play the lead roles. The lead pair had risen to fame following their appearances on Star Vijay's reality television show Bigg Boss hosted by Kamal Haasan. While Harish was selected to portray an "innocent middle-class boy", Raiza was auditioned alongside over thirty other actresses, before the team chose her to portray an "outgoing girl".

Titled Pyaar Prema Kaadhal after the lyrics of Silambarasan's "The Love Anthem", production began during mid-November 2017 in Chennai, with cinematographer Raja Battacharjee selected to work on the film. Yuvan Shankar Raja's wife Zafroon Nizar was given the opportunity to work as the costumes designer for Raiza, thus making her debut in the film industry, too.

The first schedule of the film was finished in early December 2017, with Bhanupriya also joining the cast to portray Harish Kalyan's mother; she, however, was replaced later by actress Rekha. By mid-January 2018, Elan revealed that "seventy percent" of the film was completed and that the editing process was going on simultaneously. After completing the talkie portions by March 2018, the team flew to Azerbaijan to film the last two songs, making Pyaar Prema Kaadhal, reportedly, the first Tamil film to be shot in that country.

Music 

The soundtrack album of Pyaar Prema Kaadhal was composed by Yuvan Shankar Raja, which features 12 tracks, the most ever in his album. The lyrics were written by Niranjan Bharathi, Vivek, Madhan Karky and Mohan Rajan, for one song each. Sid Sriram, Sanjith Hegde, Al Rufian and Teejay Arunachalam recorded for the film's songs, collaborating with the composer for the first time, as well as lyricists Vivek and Mohan Rajan. Director Elan provided the lyrics for five songs, while Malaysian lyricist and artist Oviya Oomapathy, who had worked on several independent single for U1 Records wrote the song "Never Let Me Go" and its solo female version.

Ahead of the album launch, two singles were released; on 13 February 2018, coinciding with the occasion of Valentines Day, the first track from the album, "High On Love", which was sung by Sid Sriram and had lyrics by Niranjan Bharathi, the grandson of the Mahakavi Subramanya Bharatiyar, was released as a single, opening to positive response from listeners. A teaser of the second single, "Dope Track" was released on 8 June 2018, and the full song was released the following day, on 9 June 2018. The song consist of variation of melody in the beginning, with a variation of EDM and dubstep, before turning into a melody in the end.

The film's tracklist was released on 26 July 2018. The audio was released on 29 July 2018 at a launch event held at the AVM Studios in Chennai, with several film personalities and friends of Yuvan Shankar Raja, including actors Dhanush, Silambarasan, Vijay Sethupathi, Arya, and Jayam Ravi; directors Ameer, Ram, and Seenu Ramasamy; and composers Ilaiyaraaja, Santhosh Narayanan, and D. Imman attending the event. The audio launch was telecasted on Zee Tamil on 4 August 2018.

The soundtrack received positive reviews from critics. The Times of India, reviewed it as "Thirteen songs in an album could make for an exhaustive listen, but the biggest plus is that almost seven of them are short, and sweet, pieces." Behindwoods gave the album 3 out of 5 stating "The romantic musical falls in place for Yuvan as he hits the high note effortlessly." Indiaglitz gave the album a rating of 3 out of 5. Milliblog commented "Pyaar Prema Kaadhal is a delightful follow-up to Irumbuthirai!" Moviecrow gave 3 out of 5 stating "Pyaar Prema Kaadhal is Yuvan effortlessly offering 100+ trending ringtones and viral clips to do dubsmash and musically for youngsters. The soulfulness of the songs depends upon our opinions about how we look at love. But as standout numbers.. Yuvan is unstoppable in this romantic soundtrack that doesn't blink an eye about being cheesy and super cheesy."

Release 
Trident Arts, acquired the Tamil Nadu theatrical rights of the film for 3 crore. Pyaar Prema Kaadhal was released on 10 August 2018. It was initially brought forward to 9 August 2018, to avoid a box office clash with Vishwaroopam II, but out of respect to the former Tamil Nadu chief minister M. Karunanidhi who died on 7 August 2018, it was pushed back to the original release date. On the day of its release, the film was illegally uploaded by piracy sites which irked controversy. The film was dubbed into Telugu version under the same name and was released on 21 September 2018.
Upon huge success of the film, it was also remade in telugu in 2022 titled Urvashivo Rakshasivo.

Home media 
The satellite rights of the film were sold to Zee Tamil. The television premiere of the film took place on 25 November 2018.

Reception

Critical reception 
The film received positive reviews from critics. The Times of India gave 3 out of 5 and stated "A little more emotional connect would have worked wonders for the film, which however managed to stay away from a clichéd climax." Behindwoods rated the film 2.75 out of 5 and stated "Pyaar Prema Kaadhal is high on love and music to entertain the youth!" Sify gave 3 out of 5 and stated "Pyaar Prema Kaadhal also has all these elements but what works in favor of the film is a fresh new pair and sensible characterization." Srinivasa Ramanujam of The Hindu commented "A refreshing take on the complications of modern romance." Deccan Chronicle gave the film a 3 out of 5 stars and stated "A major success of the movie is Elan’s well-etched characters and apt casting of the lead refreshing pair." The New Indian Express gave 3 out of 5 and stated "A gratifying musical modelled on the modern relationship." Indiaglitz gave 3 out of 5 and stated "Go for this fun and refreshing urban romance that keeps you entertained for most parts." The Indian Express gave 3 out of 5 and stated "The film felt too ‘wannabe’ at a few places. But these are very minor grouses for a film that gets most of the things right." Baradwaj Rangan of the Film Companion gave 3.5 out of 5 and stated "The film is a well-acted, well-made love story that goes far beyond rom-com clichés."

Box office 
At the end of three days, the film grossed .

Awards and nominations

Remake 
Following its success, director Elan announced that the film will be remade in Hindi, with Sandeep Singh bankrolling the project. The film was remade in Telugu as Urvasivo Rakshasivo (2022).

References

External links 
 

2018 films
2018 romantic comedy films
Indian romantic comedy films
Films scored by Yuvan Shankar Raja
Films shot in Azerbaijan
2010s Tamil-language films
Tamil films remade in other languages